Larinioides patagiatus is a species of orb weaver in the family Araneidae. It is found in North America, Europe, Turkey, Caucasus, Russia to Central Asia, China, Mongolia, and Japan.

Subspecies
 Larinioides patagiatus islandicola (Strand, 1906)
 Larinioides patagiatus patagiatus (Clerck, 1757)

References

Further reading

 
 
 

Araneidae
Spiders described in 1757
Taxa named by Carl Alexander Clerck